Methyl phenylacetate is an organic compound that is the methyl ester of phenylacetic acid, with the structural formula C6H5CH2COOCH3.  It is a colorless liquid that is only slightly soluble in water, but soluble in most organic solvents.

Methyl phenylacetate has a strong odor similar to honey.   This compound also occurs in brandy, capsicum, coffee, honey, pepper, and some wine. It is used in the flavor industry and in perfumes to impart honey scents. 

Methyl phenyldiazoacetate, precursor to cyclopropanation agents, is prepared by treating methyl phenylacetate with p-acetamidobenzenesulfonyl azide in the presence of base.

References

 "Methyl Phenyl Acetate."(February 22, 2007). Chemical Information The Good Scents Company. Retrieved on January 22, 2008.

Acetate esters
Flavors
Ester solvents
Methyl esters
Pheromones
Phenyl compounds
Sweet-smelling chemicals